The Diocese of Rome, also called the Vicariate of Rome, is the ecclesiastical district under the direct jurisdiction of the Pope, who is Bishop of Rome and hence the supreme pontiff and head of the worldwide Catholic Church. As the Holy See, the papacy is a sovereign entity with diplomatic relations, and civil jurisdiction over the Vatican City State located geographically within Rome. The Diocese of Rome is the metropolitan diocese of the Province of Rome, an ecclesiastical province in Italy. The first bishop of Rome was Saint Peter in the first century. The incumbent since 13 March 2013 is Pope Francis.

Historically, many Rome-born men, as well as others born elsewhere on the Italian Peninsula have served as bishops of Rome. Since 1900, however, there has been only one Rome-born bishop of Rome, Pius XII (1939–1958). In addition, throughout history non-Italians have served as bishops of Rome, beginning with the first of them according to Catholic tradition, Saint Peter.

It is the metropolitan archdiocese of the Roman ecclesiastical province and primatial see of Italy. The cathedral is the Archbasilica of Saint John Lateran. The primate of Italy is the pope, holding primacy of honor over the Italian sees and also primacy of jurisdiction over all other episcopal sees by Catholic tradition.

Titles

The pope is the bishop of Rome. Some of his titles derive from his role as head of the diocese of Rome. Those officially listed for him in the Annuario Pontificio are:
 Bishop of Rome
 Successor of the Prince of the Apostles
 Primate of Italy 
 Archbishop and Metropolitan of the Roman Province (also alternatively rendered as "Metropolitan Archbishop of the Province of Rome")
The title "pope" does not appear in the official list, but is commonly used in the titles of documents, and appears, in abbreviated form, in the signatures of the popes.

History

Origins 

The best evidence available for the origins of the Church in Rome is Saint Paul's Epistle to the Romans. This indicates that the church was established probably by the early 40s AD. Saint Peter became associated with this church sometime between the year 58 and the early 60s.

According to one historian:
The final years of the first century and the early years of the second constitute the "postapostolic" period, as reflected in the extrabiblical writings of Clement of Rome and Ignatius of Antioch. By now the church at Rome was exercising a pastoral care that extended beyond its own community, having replaced Jerusalem as the practical center of the growing universal Church. Appeals were made to Peter and Paul, with whom the Roman church was most closely identified.

Modern times 
On 6 January 2023, by the apostolic constitution In Ecclesiarum Communione, Pope Francis reorganised the diocese to make it more collegial and to reinforce the role of the pope in it.

Territory 
The diocese has 1,219 diocesan priests of its own, while 2,331 priests of other dioceses, 5,072 religious priests and 140 Opus Dei priests reside in its territory, as do 2,266 women religious. In 2004, they ministered to an estimated 2,454,000 faithful, who made up 88% of the population of the territory.

The city of Rome has grown beyond the boundaries of the diocese. Notable parts of the city belong to the dioceses of Ostia and Porto-Santa Rufina. Ostia is administered together with the Vicariate of the city and thus included in the statistics given below, while Porto is instead administered by its own diocesan bishop. The diocese covers an area of 849 km2 and includes most of the city and the municipality of Rome in Italy, and the entire territory of Vatican City. The diocese is divided into two vicariates, each with its respective vicar general.

Two vicars general exercise the episcopal ministry and pastoral government for their respective territories within the diocese of Rome. Unless the bishop of a diocese reserves some acts to himself, vicars general have by law within a diocese the power to undertake all administrative acts that pertain to the bishop except those that in law require a special mandate of the bishop.

Vicariate of Vatican City 

This vicariate has responsibility for the territory of Vatican City. It consists of two parishes: Saint Peter's Basilica and Saint Anne in Vatican. Its pastoral mission with respect to residents of its territory is minimal. It is primarily concerned with providing appropriate services to tourists, pilgrims, and others in Rome who avail themselves of services provided in Vatican City. Since 1991, the vicar general for Vatican City has been the cardinal who is the archpriest of St. Peter's Basilica, currently Cardinal Mauro Gambetti.

Vicars general for Vatican City

Vicariate of Rome 

The vicariate general (Vicariatus urbis) for the diocesan territory outside of Vatican City, territory that is under Italian sovereignty, is based at the Archbasilica of Saint John Lateran, which is the cathedral of the diocese. The vicar general for the Vicariate of Rome has for centuries been called the cardinal vicar. The vicariate has 336 active and 5 suppressed parishes in its territory. Since 1970 the vicar of the city of Rome has also been assigned the office of archpriest of the Lateran Archbasilica, where the diocesan curia has its headquarters. From a strictly pastoral point of view, the diocese is divided into five sectors: north, south, east, west, and center. Each sector is assigned an auxiliary bishop who collaborates with the vicar general and the vicegerent in the pastoral administration of the diocese. The five bishops of the sectors can be joined by other auxiliary bishops for specific pastoral areas such as health care ministry.

Ecclesiastical Province of Rome

Suburbicarian sees 
Six of the dioceses of the Roman Province are described as suburbicarian. Each suburbicarian diocese has a cardinal bishop at its titular head.
Suburbicarian See of Porto-Santa Rufina
Suburbicarian See of Albano
Suburbicarian See of Frascati
Suburbicarian See of Palestrina
Suburbicarian See of Sabina-Poggio Mirteto
Suburbicarian See of Velletri-Segni

Diocese of Ostia
There remains the titular Suburbicarian See of Ostia, held, in addition to his previous suburbicarian see, by the cardinal bishop elected to be the dean of the College of Cardinals. The Diocese of Ostia was merged with the Diocese of Rome in 1962, and is now administered by a vicar general, in tight cooperation with the vicar general for Rome. It was also diminished to contain only the cathedral parish of Ostia (Sant'Aurea in Ostia Antica), which, however, in 2012 was divided into two parishes, who together form the present diocese of Ostia.

Suffragan sees 
See: 
Other Italian dioceses having Rome as their metropolitan see:
Archdiocese of Gaeta (non-Metropolitan)
Diocese of Anagni-Alatri
Diocese of Civita Castellana
Diocese of Civitavecchia-Tarquinia
Diocese of Frosinone-Veroli-Ferentino
Diocese of Latina-Terracina-Sezze-Priverno
Diocese of Rieti
Diocese of Sora-Cassino-Aquino-Pontecorvo
Diocese of Tivoli
Diocese of Viterbo
Territorial Abbey of Montecassino
Territorial Abbey of Subiaco

 Other exempt (directly subject) sees 
Numerous ordinaries and personal prelatures outside the Province of Rome, worldwide, are "Exempt", i.e. "directly subject to the Holy See", not part of any ecclesiastical province, including:
 Various Latin Church dioceses directly subject to the Holy See, either due to the type of see, such as the missionary pre-diocesan Apostolic prefectures and Apostolic vicariates, although a few are exceptionally joined to an ecclesiastical province) until their promotion to 'full' bishopric, or wherever the Vatican sees fit not to assign a specific see to a province
 Personal prelatures such as Opus Dei
 Apostolic exarchates, Eastern Catholic pre-diocesan sees
 Ordinariates for Eastern Catholic faithful, Eastern Catholic, where one or more rite-specific churches sui iuris'' lack any proper jurisdiction
 Personal ordinariates for former Anglicans
 Various military ordinariates for armed forces personnel

See also 
 Holy See
 Papal primacy

References

Sources and external links 
 Official website of the Diocese of Rome
 Official website of the Holy See
 Diocese of Rome on GCatholic.org
 Diocese of Roma on Catholic-hierarchy.org

 
Apostolic sees
Rome
40s establishments in the Roman Empire
1st-century establishments in Italy
Roman Catholic ecclesiastical provinces in Italy